Squawk is the second studio album by the heavy metal band Budgie. It was released in September 1972 on Kapp Records. The album was certified Gold in 1973. The cover art was done by Roger Dean.

Track listing

Personnel
Budgie
Burke Shelley - vocals, bass, Mellotron, piano
Tony Bourge - guitar
Ray Phillips - drums

References

Budgie (band) albums
Kapp Records albums
Albums with cover art by Roger Dean (artist)
1972 albums
Albums produced by Rodger Bain
Albums recorded at Rockfield Studios